ORWO (for ORiginal WOlfen) is a registered trademark of the company ORWO Net GmbH, based in Wolfen and is also traditionally know for black and white film products, made in Germany and sold under the flag of the ORWO brand.

ORWO was established in East Germany in 1964 as a brand for photographic film and magnetic tape, mainly produced at the former ORWO Filmfabrik Wolfen (now Chemical Park Bitterfeld-Wolfen). The Wolfen factory was founded by AGFA (Aktien-Gesellschaft für Anilin-Fabrikation) in 1910 and developed the first modern colour film, which incorporated colour couplers, Agfacolor Neu, in 1936.

The partition of Germany after the Second World War saw AGFA divided, into Agfa AG, Leverkusen in West Germany, and VEB Film und Chemiefaserwerk Agfa Wolfen in East Germany, which later adopted the brand ORWO. The company was privatised in 1990 as ORWO AG, but film production ceased at Wolfen in 1994 following the liquidation of the company, with its constituent parts closed or sold off. The Industry and Film museum Wolfen now occupies part of the original factory.

One of the successor companies, FilmoTec GmbH was founded in 1998 to produce high quality black and white cinema and technical films, based in Wolfen under the ORWO brand (license rights are held by the ORWO Net GmbH). Currently, the ORWOFilm range incorporates negative film for motion picture production (UN54 and N75), duplicating film, print film, sound recording film, and film leaders for the processing and distribution business.

In 2020 FilmoTec was brought under common ownership under Seal 1818 GmbH with film coating company InovisCoat GmbH, also based in Germany and with shared Agfa heritage to offer films for the film industry under the traditional brand “ORWO”.

History

AGFA

A color dye factory was established at the Rummelsburger See near Berlin in 1867, its name was changed to AGFA (Actien-Gesellschaft für Anilin-Fabrikation) in 1873. The Wolfen factory was established by AGFA in 1910 and its original Leverkusen works (nr. Cologne) around the same time.  In 1911, the first casting plant at Wolfen for polymer films (nitrocellulose) was built by AGFA. By 1925, with AGFA now part of the industrial conglomerate I.G. Farben, Wolfen was specialising in film production and Leverkusen photographic paper. In 1932, the process of making Triacetate Cellulose (TAC) film was patented at the Wolfen facility 

The Agfa Wolfen plant developed the first modern colour film, which incorporated colour couplers, Agfacolor Neu, in 1936, which simplified processing compared to its contemporary Kodak Kodachrome from 1935.

After World War II 
On 20 April 1945, following the defeat of Nazi Germany in World War II, the Wolfen plant was taken over by US forces, and important patents and other documents regarding the Agfacolor process were confiscated and handed over to Western competitors, such as Kodak and Ilford. As the plant was located in what was to become the Soviet zone of occupied Germany, the US forces then handed it over to the Soviet military administration, which dismantled large parts of the plant and moved it, with key German staff, to Svema in Shostka, Ukraine, where it formed the basis for the Soviet colour film industry.

AGFA was split into two companies each with one of the two plants: Agfa AG, Leverkusen in West Germany, and VEB Film und Chemiefaserwerk Agfa Wolfen in East Germany.  Agfa AG (Leverkusen), by then a subsidiary of Bayer was subsequently merged with Gevaert based in Mortsel, Belgium in 1964 to form Agfa-Gevaert.

ORWO (VEB Film und Chemiefaserwerk) 

On the last day of 1953, Agfa Wolfen was returned to the GDR by the USSR as one of the last reparations companies. At this time the company still shared the AGFA trademark with Agfa Leverkusen and both companies produced films under the AGFA brand with the same names, such as Isopan F. To distinguish them, the film edge markings were L IF for Agfa Leverkusen, and W IF for Agfa Wolfen. Trading of materials however continued between plants.

In 1953 in a trade agreement it was agreed that VEB Film und Chemiefaserwerk would have the sole rights to the AGFA brand in Eastern Europe and Agfa AG, would retain sole rights to the AGFA brand in the rest of the world. This hampered Wolfens exports and therefore after 1964 films from Wolfen were rebranded ORWO (ORiginal WOlfen)

After the formation of the Combine VEB Fotochemisches Kombinat Wolfen in 1970 the VEB ORWO Filmfabrik Wolfen became its headquarters. Founder members of the new Combine were Fotopapierwerke Dresden, Fotopapierwerke Wernigerode, Gelatinewerke Calbe, Fotochemische Werke Berlin and the Lichtpausenwerk Berlin. The now Kombinat also began developing and producing other information recording materials, such as magnetic, video and computer tapes.

ORWO-branded 35mm colour slide film became available in the United Kingdom in the 1970s through magazine advertisements for mail order suppliers. It was a cheaper alternative to the mainstream brands available at the time.

ORWO prepared the changeover from AgfaColor to C-41, similar to considerations in the USSR, but had not completed until the end of the GDR, which led to decreasing sales figures in the western countries, where the Kodak C-41 process dominated the market.

In 1989, at its peak, a total of 14,500 employees were employed at the Wolfen site, encompassing an area of 165 hectares. They produced 40 million square meters of base material, of which 50 percent was processed to raw film.  There were 2,500 assemblies, producing a total of 200 different film types. The production height of magnetic recording materials was 2 million square meters, and in the chemical fibre sector, around 100,000 tons of various pulp, viscose products and special products were delivered.

Privatisation and Breakup
Following German reunification in 1990 the holding company was privatised as ORWO AG with Folienwerk Wolfen GmbH an early spin off. The Treuhand liquidated the company in 1994 and film production ceased. Attempts were made to revive the company and in 1995, Berlin-based photo merchant Heinrich Mandermann joined ORWO, and on April 1, 1996, ORWO films were put back on the market. However, they were no longer produced locally, merely assembled from products from other manufacturers such as Forte and Ilford. Due to the owners illness the company was again insolvent in 1997.

A number of separate successor companies emerged from the remnants of the former industrial behemoth;
 Folienwerk Wolfen GmbH founded 1991, PET films for packaging, printing, medical and industrial uses.
 Organica Feinchemie GmbH Wolfen, founded in 1995, organic fine chemistry.
 FEW Chemicals GmbH, founded 1997, speciality and fine chemistry.
 Island Polymer Industries GmbH, founded 1998, Triacetate Cellulose (TAC) film production using former ORWO Wolfen facility, for photographic (film base) and optical markets, largest cast film manufacturer in Europe.
 ORWO FilmoTec GmbH, founded 1998, Cine films and related technical films.
 ORWO Net AG ,founded 1999, Digital photo supplies, photofinishing.
All suppliers for the optical, electrical and film industries 

The ORWO Net GmbH retained the rights to the ORWO trademark for a variety of photographic products.

FilmoTec GmbH  

The FilmoTec GmbH was formed in 1998 to continue to manufacture a range of Black and white camera and technical films for motion picture use under the ORWO brand. Film coating was contracted out, to Ilford and later InovisCoat. In 2020, twenty employees work in the areas of research, development, production, configuration, and distribution of ORWO black and white films.

Products are particularly aimed towards the technical needs of the world's archiving, motion picture, and holographic industries.  FilmoTec is with Kodak now one of only two companies still producing black and white films for motion picture use.

In partnership with ORWO North America, ORWO film currently supplies all US Library of Congress black and white industrial films, in addition to high-profile archival clients like the Smithsonian and MOMA. For example, black-and-white movies that have been selected by the US Library of Congress for archival copy preservation in the last five years have been most likely reprocessed onto ORWO film.

The ORWO family 
In 2020 FilmoTec was brought under common ownership with film coating company InovisCoat, based in Monheim am Rhein, Germany to offer products for the film industry under the traditional brand “ORWO”, both companies sharing AGFA heritage.
In particular the new ownership structure with Filmotec and InovisCoat together with a number of other companies unites the ORWO brand, its Intellectual Property, Recipes and Research & Development with film manufacturing capabilities for the first time since ORWO AGs liquidation in 1994.

InovisCoat was founded by former employees of the consumer film division of Agfa-Gevaert, with its film coating plant based at Leverkusen, Germany which was spun off into a new company Agfa-Photo in 2004. The company (Agfa-Photo GmbH) folded a year later in 2005, although a separate holding company still retains the license rights to the Agfa-Photo brand. InovisCoat brought together technical expertise in film emulsions and coating with acquisition of one of the former Leverkusen wide coating machines for film production, and a smaller narrow coating machine for testing, relocated to new premises in Monnheim on Rhein, the new smaller scale facility capable of multi-layer film coating for both photographic and other applications. It undertakes the manufacture of coated films for a number of companies including Polaroid B.V., Adox, Bergger, Lomography and more recently ORWO Filmotec.

The companies being brought together under the ORWO name; holding company Seal 1818 GmbH, FilmoTec GmbH and InovisCoat GmbH underwent an organised restructure in 2022, to enable the introduction of new working practices and products, which due to legacy issues would otherwise prevent the company being able to quickly launch new products under the licensed ORWO name and Logo. The ORWO Net GmbH is holding all brand rights and they sell personalized photo products under the brand ORWO.

Filmotec announced the introduction of two new films to the market in 2022, a new black & white film for still camera use (expected April 2022) and a new colour cine film stock using ECN-2 development process (expected July 2022), which would provide cinematographers with an alternative to the Kodak vision 3 colour camera stocks.

Current Products

Black & white camera film

 UN54, Universal Negative Film  100 ISO, Panchromatic medium speed black-and-white negative camera film for both outdoor and indoor usage. Formats: 16mm/35mm,  122m/400ft (16mm/35mm) on core and 305m/1000ft on core (35mm). 
 N75, Negative film 400 ISO, High speed black-and-white panchromatic camera film for both outdoor and indoor usage. Formats: 16mm/35mm,  30.5m/100ft, 122m/400ft (16mm/35mm) on core and 305m/1000ft on core (35mm). 

Their motion picture camera films UN54 and N75 are also widely re-packaged by third parties as still camera film.

Other products
 Laboratory films
 Duplicating films
 Sound Recording Film
 Holographic films
 Leader films
 Special films

Discontinued Products
 Still camera film
 Magnetic tape

Wolfen Industrial and Film Museum 
The Industrie- und Filmmuseum Wolfen provides a permanent exhibition about the history of the Filmfabrik Wolfen and the ORWO products.

See also 
 Photographic film
 List of motion picture film stocks
 List of discontinued photographic films
 List of photographic films

References

Photographic film makers
Volkseigene Betriebe
Photography companies of Germany
Defunct photography companies
Companies of East Germany